Ashok Vihar is a neighbourhood in the North West Delhi district of Delhi, India. Situated along the Ring Road, Delhi, it is divided into four phases.

Education
There are several schools in Ashok Vihar which include Mata Jai Kaur Public School, Prudence School, Kulachi Hansraj Model School, Montfort Senior Secondary School, DAV Public School, Lions Public School and Maharaja Agarsain Public School. Also, two colleges namely Satyawati College and Lakshmibai College, affiliated to University of Delhi, are located here.

Parks and sports club

Other than Ashoka Garden, there are neighborhood parks in each block/pocket/phase, there are two major parks namely - Baba Chaudhary Khimman Singh Park and Picnic Hut.

In addition to these parks, there is a sports complex named after Major Dhyan Chand which was established in the year 1991 by Delhi Development Authority. It offers various indoor and outdoor courts and a pool.

Apart from parks, there is a green belt that stretches from The I block of Phase-1 to the I-A Block.

Transport

Ashok Vihar is well connected through road and public transport. It has three Delhi Metro stations namely Keshav Puram, Kanhiya Nagar two of them situated on Red Line and Shalimar Bagh Metro Station on the Pink Line. Delhi Transport Corporation buses No 166 (Shalimar Bagh to Palika Kendra), 181(A) (Jahangir Puri to Nizzamudin Rly. Station), 142 (Jahangir Puri to I.S.B.T.) and 235 (Wazirpur J.J. Colony to Nand Nagri), in addition Metro feeder bus service between Inderlok Metro Station to Azad Pur Metro Station is also available.

Hospitals and dispensaries

The main hospitals are Maharaja Agarsen Hospital, Jivodaya Hospital and Deep Chand Bandhu Government Hospital. An Ayurvedic dispensary has been set up by Government of Delhi. Also, C.G.H.S. dispensary is located here. Aam Aadmi polyclinic set up by the Delhi government is also located in the area. There are also a few private hospitals like Citizen Hospital, Nayati Sunderlal Jain Hospital and Dr. BD Attam Hospital and Medical Research Centre.

References 

 Map of Ashok Vihar

Neighbourhoods in Delhi
North West Delhi district